Banu Asad is an Arab tribe, descended from Asad ibn Khuzayma. They are Adnanite Arabs, powerful and one of the most famous tribes. They are widely respected by many Arab tribes, respected by Shia Muslims because they have buried the body of Husayn ibn Ali, his family (Ahl al-Bayt) and companions with the help of Ali ibn Husayn Zayn al-Abidin, the son of Husayn, and many martyrs from the Battle of Karbala are from the tribe. Today, many members of the tribe live in the Iraqi cities of Basra, Najaf, Kufa, Karbala, Nasiriyah, Amarah, Kut, Hillah, Diyala and Baghdad. There is a branch from the Banu Assad in Northern Sudan called Banu Kahil who have migrated from the Hijaz to Sudan. There are also members of Bani Assad tribe in Ahvaz in the Khuzestan of Iran located with neighboring tribes of Banu Tamim, Bani Malik, Banu Kaab and other notable Arab tribes.

Lineage
The Bani Asad are the patrilineal lineage originating from a man named Asad bin Khuzaimah bin Mudrikah bin Ilyas bin Mudar bin Nizar bin Ma'ad bin Adnan ...bin Qedar bin Ismâʿīl (Ishmael) bin Ibrahim (Abraham).

The Asad tribe that exists today are from Mudar (Mudarites), said to be cousins of the Islamic prophet, Muhammad who share with them the same ancestor Khuzaimah ibn Mudrikah ibn Ilyas ibn Mudar.

Legacy of the Banu Asad
In the 6th century the Banu Asad revolted against the kingdom of kindah, A king of Kindah named Hujr was killed by the Banu Asad. Who is the father of the last king of kindah Imru' al-Qais, which started a long war between kindah with the help of some tribes like Taghlib who were under them against the banu asad, the Himyarite Kingdom aided imru al-Qais in this war, the war results were the end of the kingdom of kindah and imru al-Qais fleeing nejd region, the illustrious Arabian mu'allaqat poet 'Abid bin al-Abras belonged to the Banu Asad and was fond of vaunting Hujr's murder.
In the Namara inscription, Nasrid king of al-Hira, Imru al-Qays ibn Amr claimed he killed two chiefs from Bani Assad, which is mentioned in Ibn Ishaq where their nephew said a poem about her two uncles the Asadites "One came early to tell me of the death of the two best of Asad, 'Amr b. Mas'tid and the dependable chief (alsamad)".

Banu Asad had their own Talbiyah of the prilgrimmage to Mecca before Islam.

Conflicts with Muhammad
The Islamic prophet Muhammad was involved in armed conflict against this tribe. The first conflict was the Expedition of Qatan in June 625    Muhammad ordered his followers to attack the Banu Asad bin Khuzaymah tribe after receiving intelligence that they were allegedly plotting to attack Medina 3 people were captured by Muslims during that expedition. The second one was the Expedition of Ukasha bin Al-Mihsan in 627, Muhammad ordered his followers to attack the Banu Asad bin Khuzaymah tribe to capture booty/spoils

They also were involved in the Expedition of Al Raji where they were bribed to kill some Muslims on behalf of the Banu Lahyan tribe. According to William Montgomery Watt, the most common version of the event states that the motives of the Banu Lahyan for attacking Muslims, was that the Banu Lahyan wanted to get revenge for the assassination of their chief at Muhammad's instigation. So they bribed the two tribes of Khuzaymah to say they wanted to convert to Islam. Watt also said that the seven men Muhammad sent may have been spies for Muhammad and instructors for Arab tribes. He also said that it is difficult to verify the exact date the assassination of their chief took place.

Migration to Iraq
The Banu Asad migrated to Iraq in the 7th century and settled in Kufa. They have settled near the banks of the Euphrates river near Kufa and Karbala and have also settled in Basra and in Ahvaz, sharing land with the Banu Tamim. The Bani Assad sided with Ali in the Battle of the Camel. Many companions of Muhammad and Ali are from the Bani Assad. The Bani Assad tribe sided with Husayn ibn Ali in the Battle of Karbala, which took place on Muharram 10th, 61 AH (October 9 or 10, 680 CE) in Karbala, Iraq. Many martyrs from the Bani Assad clan died with Husayn in the Battle of Karbala.

The Mazyadid emirate of the Banu Asad

In 998, Ali ben Mazyad, leader of the Baniu Asad tribe, established a virtually independent Mazyadid state in the Kufa area of Iraq. Backed by a powerful tribal army, the Mazyadids enjoyed great influence in the area for a century and a half. They acquired titles and subsidies from the Buyids in return for military services. Their most lasting achievement was the founding of Hillah, one of the main cities in Iraq, which became their capital in 1012. The originator of the Mazyadid name was a scholar, hadith narrator and chemist called Mazyad ben Mikhled al Sadaqa. Imad ad-Din al-Isfahani commented about the Mazyadid rulers, saying:

Members of the Bani Assad clan outside Iraq
Mansour Moosa Al-Mazeedi played an important role in developing the Constitution of Kuwait issued on January 29, 1963 as part of Al Majles Al Ta'sesy or Founding Parliament.

The Al Mazeedi family are Shia in Iraq, dramatically increasing the influence of Shia minorities in Arabia. And there are also Al Mazeedi Shia families in Kuwait as well as Sunni. Recently it was discovered that some Al-Mazeedi family members migrated to Yemen a few hundred years ago and settled in the region of Hadhramaut. Their tribal name is Al-Mazyad or Banu Asad, their surnames or their family names is Assadi, Al-Assadi, or Al-Mazeedi, some (about 1,000) were also found in Oman and in India, primarily in the state of Karnataka with ancestral concentration in a place called Thokur, a village in Mangalore. A group of Sunni Muslims having Assadi as surname arrived at the Mangalore Port during the rule of Tipu Sultan.  These Persian speaking sailors claimed their ancestry from Banu Assad. They built a Community center by name Thokur Jamia Masjid in Thokur village of Mangalore .

Fatalities from the Banu Asad in the Battle of Karbala

Habib ibn Muzahir (commander of the left flank), Muslim ibn Awsaja al-Asadi, Uns ibn Hars Asadi, Qais ibn Masher Asadi, Abu Samama Umru ibn Abdullah, Ureer Hamdani, Hanala ibn Asad, Abis Shakri, Abdul Rahman Rahbi, Saif ibn Hars, Amer ibn Abdellah Hamdani.

Burials
On the 13th of Muharram, three days after the massacre, members of the Banu Asad in Karbala had the honor of burying the bodies of Husayn, his family and their companions. The Banu Ad tribe is widely respected by other Shia Arab tribes. Ali ibn Husayn Zayn al-Abidin, the 4th Twelver Shia Imam, helped the Banu Asad tribe to bury the martyred bodies and helped them to identify the bodies of Husayn ibn Ali, his father, and the Ahl al-Bayt and their companions.

Clans

All clans are related which goes back to the same tribe or ancestor of Asad.

Al-Taraihi
Al-Khayoon tribe
Al-Hassan
Al-Jayyid
Al-Janaah
Al-Sheikh
Bani Askari tribe
Al-Abdul Ameer
Al-A'beed
Al-Sheikh Ali
Al-Sh'haab
Al-Wanis tribe
Al-Freeh
Al-Khaitan
Al-Badir
Al-Ghaithan
Al-Jasim
Al-Sh'haf
Al-Tarshaan
Al-Hamad
Al-Khamees
Al-Abbas tribe
Al-Bu Sodah
Al-Bu Sidyo
Al-Bu Zahroon
Al-Haddad tribe
Al-Rasheeda
Al-Mas'ood
Al-Sajiyah
Al-Shneen
Al-Awaad
Al-Hjool
Al-Hlool
Al-Aneesa (Anisa) tribe
Al-Sahr
Al-Ataab
Al-Sweenij
Al-Abdallah tribe
Al-Sawaad
Al-Finjaan
Al-Bu Ayaash
Al-Hajj Sari
Al-Makhyour
Al-Oweeti
Al-Hjemeen
Al-Rofah (Raufah)
Al-Sawari
Al-Dilfeen
Al-Khazaam
Al-Saleh Khalawi Jabr
Al-Rahi
Al-Sidyo
Al-Mawajid tribe
Al-Eisa
Al-Hwaichim (Huwaijim)
Al-Hajji
Al-Ta'ama Nasir
Al-Shjreeji
Al-Khalisi tribe
Al-bu Mahdi
Al-bu Ali
Al-Sabayigh
Al-Khatir tribe
Al-Aziz
Al-Sheikh Mohammed
Al-Sheikh La'eebi Jabir
Al-Bazoon
Al-Jam'iyat
Al-Bdeer
Al Abeidallah
Al-Khazzam
Al-Bu Sedwear
Al-Sawari
Al-Sari
Al-Bu Makhyour
Bani Mushrif (includes many clans)
Al-Hilal
Al-Mazeedi (includes clans)
Bani Kahel (includes clans)
Al-Nawashi
Al-Hul
Al Reyoufa
Al-Bu Hmael
Al-Terrhiyoun
Al-Kammouna
Al-Shibeebi
Al-Hmaed
Al-Baghdadi
Al-Ghamaas
Al-Jaza'iri
Bayram

. 
There are Sayyids who have joined the Bani Assad tribe, in southern Iraq many centuries ago
There are more tribes and clans of Banu Asad

Leading personalities

Dhiraar bin Al-Azwar 
Tulayha

See also 
List of battles of Muhammad

References

Other sources
 Wiesenhöfer, Josef. Ancient Persia. pages 231 to 235. .
 Bani Assad in Ashura.
 https://web.archive.org/web/20170330190328/http://al-hakawati.net/english/Culture_Traditions/bani_asad.asp

Mudar
Tribes of Arabia
Tribes of Saudi Arabia
Tribes of Iraq
Yemeni tribes